Stasija Rage (born May 9, 1991) is a Latvian former competitive figure skater. She was born in Riga, and was the 2008 Latvian national champion. She started skating at age four.

Programs

Competitive highlights
JGP: Junior Grand Prix

References

External links

 

1991 births
Living people
Latvian female single skaters
Sportspeople from Riga
21st-century Latvian women